Dihydrothymine is an intermediate in the metabolism of thymine.

Ureas
Imides
Pyrimidinediones
Nucleobases